Montblanc (UK: /ˌmɒ̃ˈblɒ̃(k)/, US: /ˌmɑnˈblɑŋk/) is a German manufacturer and distributer of luxury goods, founded in Berlin in 1906, and currently based in Hamburg. The company is most known for its luxury pens and also designs and distributes bags, small leather goods, and watches. Since 1993, Montblanc has been part of the Swiss Richemont group.

History 
A Hamburg banker, Alfred Nehemias, and a Berlin engineer, August Eberstein, produced simple pens in 1906. After a short period of time Wilhelm Dziambor, Christian Lausen, and later Claus Johannes Voss took over the business. Their first model was the Rouge et Noir in 1909 followed in 1910 by the pen that was later to give the company its new name, Montblanc. The Meisterstück name (the name used for export) was used for the first time in 1924. Today, the Montblanc brand is on other goods besides pens, including watches, jewellery, fragrances, leather goods, and eyewear.

The company was founded in 1906 as Simplizissiumus-Füllhalter in Berlin, and in 1907, moved to Hamburg and changed its name to Simplo Filler Pen Co. GmbH; it was incorporated under that name in 1908. Its current name was adopted in 1934.

Montblanc was acquired by Alfred Dunhill Ltd. in 1977, following which lower price pens were dropped, and the brand was used on a wide range of luxury goods other than pens.

In 1993, Montblanc became part of the Swiss Richemont group. Its sister companies include luxury brands Cartier, Van Cleef & Arpels, Chloé, and Baume et Mercier. Montblanc is owned, through Richemont, by the South African Rupert family.

In October 2014 the first blocking order against trademark infringing consumer goods was passed against the major UK Internet service providers (ISPs) by Montblanc to block several domains selling trademark infringing products.

Products 

Montblanc is most known for its luxury pens and also designs and distributes bags, small leather goods, and watches. In 2022, the company began collaborating with streetwear brand BAPE and lifestyle brand Maison Kitsuné to broaden its leather goods portfolio and attract a younger audience. CEO Nicolas Baretzki told Vogue Business in 2022 he believes leather goods will become one of the company's biggest categories, possibly even overtaking pens.

Montblanc makes several models of pens, with the Meisterstück (fountain pen) representing the cornerstone model. Each is slightly different, however Meisterstück models created after 1990 have a serial number located on the ring at the top of the clip, and under the clip is usually has "Pix" engraved however this has been phased out in recent production and replaced with "Made in Germany METAL". The barrels of pens made of black 'precious resin' will reveal a reddish hue under strong lighting; if the pen in question does not have these attributes then it is possibly a fake.

Branding 

A trademark identified with Montblanc is the white stylized six-pointed snowcap with rounded edges, representative of the Mont Blanc snowcap from above, the symbol being adopted in 1913. The number "4810", the mountain's height in metres, is also a commonly recurring theme.

In January 2014, Hugh Jackman was announced as Montblanc's Global Brand Ambassador, outside of the United States.

In November 2019, Montblanc launched their partnership with The Webster for a limited-edition, capsule collection.

Gallery

See also 
 Meisterstück

References

External links

Official website

1906 establishments in Germany
Fountain pen and ink manufacturers
German brands
Luxury brands
Manufacturing companies based in Hamburg
Manufacturing companies established in 1906
Richemont brands
Watch brands
Watch manufacturing companies of Germany